Acalyptris lesbia is a moth of the family Nepticulidae. It is only known from Skala Kallonis on Lesbos in Greece.

The wingspan is 4-4.8 mm.

The larvae feed on Limonium gmelinii. They mine the leaves of their host plant. The mine consists of a full-depth gallery, starting much contorted, often spirally, later becoming a full-depth mine with a narrow broken, brown frass line, following a straighter course
through the leaf. The larval exit hole is located on the upperside of the leaf. The cocoon is white and usually spun on the underside of the leaf.

References

External links 
 Acalyptris Meyrick: revision of the platani and staticis groups in Europe and the Mediterranean (Lepidoptera: Nepticulidae)

Nepticulidae
Endemic fauna of Greece
Moths of Europe
Lesbos
Moths described in 2007